José Francisco Hila Vargas (born 1972) is a Spanish Socialist Workers' Party (PSOE) politician. He was elected to Palma de Mallorca City Hall in 2007, and has been mayor from 2015 to 2017 and again since 2019.

Biography
Born in the working-class neighbourhood of Son Gotleu, Hila graduated in Economics. In 2007, he was elected to the City Council. He was a deputy mayor to Aina Calvo from 2007 to 2011.

In December 2014, Hila succeeded Calvo as lead candidate for the PSOE in Palma, with 63% of the votes. In the elections of June 2015, his party won six seats, while Més per Mallorca and Podemos took five each; they formed a coalition and installed him as mayor, with the agreement to pass the role onto Antoni Noguera of Més halfway through the term in 2017. 

In the 2019 elections, Hila returned to being mayor, after forming a government with the same two parties and delegating certain policy areas to them. He pledged to take action on housing, and to improve public transport and green areas.

In March 2021, Hila attracted scrutiny for having cited the Law of Historical Memory to change the names of three streets he believed to have connotations to Francoist Spain. The streets honoured the Admirals Churruca, Gravina and Cervera, all of whom died decades before the Spanish Civil War. Hila believed that the streets were named after ships of the same name, used – not exclusively – by the Nationalists of the war. He later reversed his decision. A proposal was also reversed on renaming a street named after Toledo, due to it being the site of a battle won by the Nationalists.

References

1972 births
Living people
People from Palma de Mallorca
Spanish Socialist Workers' Party politicians
Mayors of places in the Balearic Islands